Cybister extenuans, is a species of predaceous diving beetle found in India and Sri Lanka.

References 

Dytiscidae
Insects of Sri Lanka
Beetles described in 1858